Sivanathan Shanmugavelan Ramamoorthy (16 January 1952 – 11 May 2021), better known by his stage name Nellai Siva, was a comedian and a supporting actor, who predominantly worked in Tamil cinema. He worked mostly in comedy scenes. His first film was Aan Paavam released in 1985. He appeared in popular movies like Mahaprabhu, Vetri Kodi Kattu, Kannum Kannum. His way of speaking in the movies is completely of Nellai slang, which shows him unique from other supporting actors. He acted in over 500 films in his career.

Early life 
Nellai Siva was born on 16 January 1952, in Veppilankulam, a small village in Nellai district. He was an avid fan of Sivaji Ganesan and came to Chennai to make a break in films. He met and became good friends with Mansoor Ali Khan and Bonda Mani, who were also upcoming actors at the time. After struggling for over a decade, he met K. Bhagyaraj and participated in a few series on Chennai Television, gaining popularity, and whom he credits with "making him successful in cinema". He also started his film career by acting alongside then-famous actor Nagesh, who admired his Tirunelveli slang on set and encouraged him to use it as a defining factor in his comedy.

Film career 
In 1985 he debuted in the movie Aan Paavam directed by Pandiarajan. Later, he acted in minor roles. In the late 1990s he started his career as a supporting comedian. He starred in the film Vetri Kodi Kattu as a tea shop owner. After this movie, he slowly progressed by acting in big movies like Saamy, Anbe Sivam, Thirupaachi, Kireedam and much more. He also acted along with Vadivelu and Vivek in films during 2000s. He is notable for his comedian roles along with actor Vadivelu whose movies became very popular.

Television career 
In 2018-2021, he acted in Tamil television serials in Vijay TV such as Pandiyan Stores. His role as 'Kumaresan Mama' in Pandian Stores was a notable one. He was also a part of Mama Mapillai. On 11 May 2021, he died in Chennai due to heart attack.

Filmography 
This is a partial filmography. You can expand it.

References

External links 
 

1952 births
2021 deaths
Indian male comedians
Indian male film actors
Tamil comedians
People from Tirunelveli district